Fifth Ward Community Redevelopment Corporation  (also known as Fifth Ward CRC) is a community-based agency located on 4300 Lyons Ave in the Fifth Ward of Houston, TX.
The Fifth Ward CRC is a 501(c)(3) non-profit Texas Corporation and is classified as a public charity under sections 509(a)(1) along with 170(b)(1)(A)(vi) of the Internal Revenue Code.  Contributions made to FWCRC are deductible under section 170 of the Internal Revenue Code.

Mission statement
The mission of Fifth Ward CRC is to serve as a catalytic organization dedicated to the collaborative fostering of holistic community development.

Organization motto 
Creating a Community of Choice... A better place to live, work, and play!

History
The 5th Ward dates back to the 1800s, and takes its name from Houston's original system of city government: splitting the city into different wards to represent different communities. The 5th Ward was created in 1866 to accommodate the influx of people arriving in Houston after the Civil War. Although the ward system of government was discontinued in 1906, the name remained. The discontinuation of the ward system also meant that the official boundaries of the 5th Ward were in dispute. Today, the 5th Ward is recognized as "bounded by Buffalo Bayou on the south, Lockwood Drive on the east, Liberty Road on the north, and Jensen Drive on the west" and is considered a Super Neighborhood by the city of Houston.

The 5th Ward served as one of the economic centers for African-Americans in Houston from the 1940s to the 1960s. However, The 5th Ward experienced social and economic instability throughout the 1970s and 1980s. A combination of desegregation and recession had a significant negative impact on the 5th Ward. Many of the residents were moving into suburban neighborhoods, leaving the area with boarded-up homes and overgrown lots. Businesses were leaving the area and public school drop-out rates were increasing, resulting in a lack of viable employment options and causing the threat of school closures. During this time, Texas Monthly referred to the 5th Ward as “Texas’ toughest, proudest, baddest ghetto.”

In April 1989 civic leaders, business owners, ministers and educators created the Fifth Ward CRC in response to the problems troubling the neighborhood. After many town meetings, the mission and goals of Fifth Ward CRC was created by the community. The organization started to see results during the 1990s and became known as a “model of sustainable nonprofit-private partnership” that facilitated "small but significant" changes.

Organizational operations
A board of directors and a 15-member board of trustees runs the Fifth Ward CRC. The boards are composed of community residents and elected representatives. The trustees meet monthly to set policy and evaluate progress. The president/chief executive officer (Kathy Payton) and staff provide the day-to-day management of the organization.

Board of Directors 
Kathy Payton, chief executive
Rev. Harvey Clemons Jr., founder
Reverend Charles Turner, chairman
Bridgette Steele, vice chair
Bridgette M. Dorian, secretary

Trustees 
April Daniels 
Bob Eury
Wiley Henry
Ann Taylor
Anthony Wilcots
Gaila Bolden
Laura Nichols

Services
 Credit and Loan Counseling
 Direct Lending
 Home-buyer Education
 Financial Literacy Training
 Delinquency Counseling and Foreclosure Intervention
 Land Development
 Real Estate Development
 Commercial Development
 Homeownership Promotion
 Homeowner Repair
 Single-family home acquisition and rehabilitation
 Historic Preservation
 Community and Supportive Services

Other services are provided through specialized partnerships. Many of Fifth Ward partners specialize targeting particular group. The beneficiary groups served by the community partners included youth, adults, elderly and disabled, low-moderate income families and small businesses.

Notable achievements

 Built 300+ new homes
 Built two multifamily complexes
 Lyons Village Townhomes (3300 Lyons Avenue)
 Park Village Apartments (14100 Rio Bonito)
 Built two commercial developments
 Fifth Ward Business & Financial Center  (4300 Lyons Avenue)
 Lyons Village (3300 Lyons Avenue)
 Re-habituated two commercial properties
 Associates Health (4519 Lyons Avenue)
 Robey Clinic (4120 Lyons Avenue)
 Installed four public art installations
 Local artist Bert Long’s “Field of Vision” on Lyons  Avenue
Mural on the historic Deluxe Theater
 Mural on the 3316 Lyons building
 Mural located at Lyons Village.
 Installed two community gateway monuments
 The "Fruits of the Fifth Ward" mural, located on Schwartz St. at Highway 59
 The "Hi Monument", located on Lyons Avenue at Highway 59
Partnered with the 2012 Starbucks National Conference to accomplish the following tasks:
Painted more than 80 homes
Built one KaBOOM! playground
Planted two urban gardens
Cleaned up 100 lots/32 blocks
Partnered with Reliant Energy to install a solar-powered splash pad water play area

See also
Fifth Ward, Houston
The six wards of Houston
History of Houston
Houston
Housing Policy
Community Development
Nonprofit Organization

References

Organizations based in Houston